Qalibaf-e Olya (also Romanized as Qālībāf-e ‘Olyā; also known as Qālībāf-e Bālā) is a village in Firuzeh Rural District, in the Central District of Firuzeh County, Razavi Khorasan Province, Iran. At the 2006 census, its population was 51, in 12 families.

References 

Populated places in Firuzeh County